The Building is an American sitcom television series which aired on CBS from August 20 to September 17, 1993. While it was praised by critics, it earned low Nielsen ratings and was cancelled after only five episodes, leaving one episode unaired. It starred Bonnie Hunt.

Premise
Bonnie Kennedy, a commercial actress who was jilted by her fiancé (George Clooney) shortly before the show started, moves back to Chicago to pick up the pieces of her life in an apartment across from Wrigley Field. The story focuses on Kennedy's struggles and the characters who live in her apartment building.

Production notes
Making heavy use of The Second City alum, the show had a theatrical sensibility wherein minor mistakes, accidents, and forgotten lines were often left in the aired episode, and there was a loose improv feel to certain scenes.  The Building was the first sitcom production of David Letterman's Worldwide Pants production company; Letterman appears (unbilled) in a character role in the second episode.  Hunt created the show, and wrote four of the five broadcast episodes.  A sixth episode was produced, but did not air.

Two years after this show was cancelled, cast members Hunt, Lake, Virtue and Wortell would return in the series The Bonnie Hunt Show.  This follow-up series retained many of the distinguishing characteristics of The Building, including the Chicago setting, an improv/theatrical feel, and the essential nature of the character relationships between the principals (although they were playing different characters).  As well, the follow-up series was produced by Worldwide Pants, written by Hunt, and mostly directed by John Bowab.

Cast
Bonnie Hunt as Bonnie Kennedy.  Bonnie is a struggling actress, best known as the "Randolph Carpet Girl" in a series of local ads.
Holly Wortell as Holly, Bonnie's best friend and fellow actress.
Don Lake as Brad, who lives downstairs.  Brad often drops by to mooch coffee and meals from Bonnie.
Tom Virtue as Stan, Brad's roommate.  An actor, he and Bonnie seem mutually attracted to each other.
Richard Kuhlman as Big Tony.  Rough around the edges, but generally decent and friendly, Big Tony lives upstairs and maintains the building.  His wife, Antionette, is often heard yelling loudly offstage but is never seen.
Mike Hagerty as Finley, a one-time firefighter who runs the nearby bar/hangout called "G&L Fire Escape".
Andy Dick as Joe Devane, a talkative casting agent Bonnie often deals with.

Guest Stars
George Clooney as Sam, 
David Letterman as The Thief, 
George Wendt as Peter, 
Richard Kind as Tony, 
Donald O'Connor as Mr. Harper, 
Jim Belushi as Dave.

Episodes

References

Bonnie Hunt: Building a Sitcom, LA Times, August 15, 1993.

External links
 

1990s American sitcoms
1993 American television series debuts
1993 American television series endings
CBS original programming
English-language television shows
Television shows set in Chicago
Television series by Worldwide Pants
Television series by Sony Pictures Television
Television series by CBS Studios